Fijeroga is a small settlement near Koštabona in the City Municipality of Koper in the Littoral region of Slovenia.

References

External links
Fijeroga on Geopedia

Populated places in the City Municipality of Koper